Janesville (also known as Smithmill) is an unincorporated community in Clearfield County, Pennsylvania, United States. Janesville has a post office with ZIP code 16680, which opened on February 25, 1826.

References

Unincorporated communities in Clearfield County, Pennsylvania
Unincorporated communities in Pennsylvania